The Danish Defence Estates and Infrastructure Organisation (DDEO) (/FES), is a Level.I authority, directly under the Danish Ministry of Defence. It was created in 2014 after the Construction and Establishments Service was reorganized, due to the Defence Agreement 2013-17.

Organization
DDEO holds the authority that handles all construction and building projects for all other authorities under the Danish Ministry of Defence. It does not actually do the building itself, but rather is the project manager and works out all the plans on how it should be done and who should do it.

The DDEO is also responsible for such things as property assessments, selling and buying property, legal consultation, preservations, energy, environmental issues.
It also administrates the Danish Defence's 700 rental properties.

History

Defence Construction Service

DDEO can trace its history back to 1684, when King Christian V setup three fortifications services for Denmark, Schleswig-Holstein and Norway. In 1952, the Army Construction Service, merged with Navy Construction Service and Coast Fortification Service, to form the Defence Construction Service/DCS (/FBT).

Construction and Establishments Service
In January 2007, due to the Defence agreement 2005-2009, significant changes took take place in DCS, which is to eventually evolve into Construction and Establishments Service/CES (/FBE), by incorporating decentralized departments located in various military regiments, as well as the Defence Command's infrastructure department, for a more streamlined organization.

Misuse of funds
In December 2019, it was reported that there were violations of rules in 75 percent of the purchases related to the DDEO. In extreme cases, payment was given to tasks which were never completed.
As a result, the director of the DDEO, Hans J. Høyer, was removed from his post and Chief of Defence Bjørn Bisserup was made acting director.

References

Military of Denmark
Defence estate management agencies